René Cédolin (born 13 July 1940) is a retired French footballer and football manager.

Career
Cédolin played as a defender, for SM Caen and Stade Rennais F.C., where he spent most of his career, winning the Coupe de France twice in 1965 and 1971.

Coaching career
He began his coaching career with Stade Rennais F.C. and also coached Troyes AC, En Avant Guingamp and Angers SCO.

References

1940 births
Living people
People from Mantes-la-Jolie
French footballers
French football managers
Stade Malherbe Caen players
Stade Rennais F.C. players
Ligue 1 players
Stade Rennais F.C. managers
ES Troyes AC managers
En Avant Guingamp managers
Angers SCO managers
Association football defenders
Footballers from Yvelines